The Left Behind film series depicts the End Times as depicted by the Left Behind books by Tim LaHaye and Jerry B. Jenkins.

The films were produced by Cloud Ten Pictures and directed by Marjonneke Tjerkstra (The Original Left Behind), Vic Sarin (Left Behind: The Movie), Bill Corcoran (Left Behind II: Tribulation Force), and Craig R. Baxley (Left Behind: World at War). Kirk Cameron stars as Buck Williams, along with Brad Johnson, Janaya Stephens, Clarence Gilyard Jr., Gordon Currie, Chelsea Noble, Colin Fox, and Academy Award winner Louis Gossett Jr.

The films received mostly negative reviews from critics. All three were criticized for their low production quality.

The franchise also features its documentary version just called The Original Left Behind, a real-time movie, released in 1994, reporting the activities that cause the disappearance of humans, with testimonials from people and authorities linked to religion.

Directed by Marjonneke Tjerkstra, the documentary was released in 1994, serving as inspiration for the films to come.

Films

Original series 
Left Behind: The Movie (2000) – Direct to Video then Theatrical
Left Behind II: Tribulation Force (2002) – Direct to video
Left Behind: World at War (2005) – Direct to video

Reboot 
Left Behind (2014) – Theatrical
Left Behind: Rise of the Antichrist (2023) – Theatrical

Spin-off series 
 Vanished – Left Behind: Next Generation (2016) – Theatrical

Documentary 
 The Original Left Behind (1994) - Direct to video

Cast

References 

Left Behind series
Films about evangelicalism
American film series
Films based on works by Jerry B. Jenkins
Films based on works by Tim LaHaye
Christian apocalyptic films
Cloud Ten Pictures films